The Canadian province of Ontario has a significant number of ghost towns. These are most numerous in the Central Ontario and Northern Ontario regions, although a smaller number of ghost towns can be found throughout the province.

A
Altona
Auld Kirk Scotch Settlement
Aultsville

B
Balaclava, Grey County 
Balaclava, Renfrew County (partial) 
Ball's Falls
Ballycroy
Balvenie
Biscotasing (partial)
Blairton
Brent (partial)
Brudenell (revived)
Burchell Lake
Burwash
Byng Inlet (partial)

C
Cashmere, Southwest Middlesex, Middlesex County, Ontario
Cook Station, Haldimand County, Ontario
Cooper's Falls (partial)
Corbyville (partial)
Craigmont (partial)
Creighton Mine
Chippaweska
Cordova Mines (partial)

D
Dartmoor
Dawn Mills (revived)
Decker Hollow
Depot Harbour
Dickinson's Landing
Dome & Dome Extension
Donnybrook

E
Edenvale
Elmbank

F
Falkenburg
Farran's Point
Fleetwood
Foymount
Franz
French River

G
Garden Island
Glanmire
Goudreau
Grant

H
Happy Valley
Herron's Mills (revived)
High Falls
Horaceville
Horncastle

I
Indiana

J
Jackfish
Jerome Mine

K
Kennaway
Khartum
Khiva
Kiosk
Kormak (partial)

L
Leeblain
Lieury
Lemieux
Lost Channel
Letterkenny

M
Mafeking
Maguire
Malcolm
Maple Grove
Marlbank (partial)
Mayerville
Maynooth Station
McGaw
Metropolitan
Millbridge
Millbridge Station
Mille Roches
Milnet
Moiles Mills
Monsell
Moulinette
Mount Healey
Mount Horeb
Mulock
Murphy's Corners

N
Nakina
Napier (partial)
Nemegos
Newfoundout, Renfrew County
Nephton
Nicholson
Nickleton
Northwood

O
O'Donnell

P
Pakesley
Parker (partial)
Petworth
Pickerel
Pickle Crow
Point Anne 
Ponsonby
Port Talbot

R
Ragged Rapids
Ramsey
Redwater
Reesor

S
Santa Cruz
Seguin Falls
Sellwood
Sheek's Island
Silver Centre
Silver Islet
Sodom
Spence
Spidertown
Spry
Squires Beach
Strathaven
Sulphide (revived)
Swords

T
Tomiko

V
Victoria Mines
Vroomanton (revived)

W
Wales
Wesleyville
Whitfield
Winisk
Woodhill
Woodlands
Worthington (original site)

References

External links
Ontario Ghost Towns
Ontario's Ghost Towns and Abandoned Places
Ghost Towns Ontario
Ontario and Canadian Ghost Town Photos

Ontario
Ghost towns